Lick Creek is a stream in Crawford County in the U.S. state of Missouri. It is a tributary of the Meramec River.

Lick Creek most likely was named for mineral licks along its course.

See also
List of rivers of Missouri

References

Rivers of Crawford County, Missouri
Rivers of Missouri